"Every Time I Feel the Spirit" (aka "Ev'ry Time I Feel the Spirit") is an African-American spiritual dating to before the US Civil War.  The song has been frequently recorded by contemporary artists and gospel music groups.

Lyrics

Refrain
Every time I feel the Spirit 
moving in my heart I will pray.
Yes, every time I feel the Spirit 
moving in my heart I will pray

Verse 1
Upon the mountain, when my Lord spoke, 
out of God's mouth came fire and smoke.
Looked all around me, it looked so fine,
till I asked my Lord if all was mine. [Refrain]

Verse 2
Jordan River, chilly and cold,
it chills the body but not the soul.
There is but one train upon this track.
It runs to heaven and then right back. [Refrain]

Alternative Lyrics
Refrain
Every time I feel the Spirit 
moving in my heart I will pray.
Yes, every time I feel the Spirit 
moving in my heart I will pray

Verse 1
Upon the mountain, my Lord spoke, 
out his mouth came fire and smoke.
All around me, looks so shine,
ask my Lord if all was mine. [Refrain]

Verse 2
Jordan River, runs right cold,
chills the body not the soul.
Ain't but one train on this track,
runs to heaven and right back. [Refrain]
<ref>{{cite web|title= The United Methodist Hymnal Hymn 404 Every Time I Feel the Spirit

See also 
Christian child's prayer § Spirituals

References

External links
 Lyrics to "Every Time I Feel the Spirit" (first version) at negrospirituals.com
 Lyrics to "Every Time I Feel the Spirit" (second version) at negrospirituals.com

African-American cultural history
African-American spiritual songs
Gospel songs
Year of song unknown
Songwriter unknown